The Dickinson System was a mathematical point formula that awarded national championships in college football. Devised by University of Illinois economics professor Frank G. Dickinson, the system ranked national teams from 1924 to 1940.

The system was originally designed to rank teams in the Big Nine (later the Big Ten) conference.  Chicago clothing manufacturer Jack Rissman then persuaded Dickinson to rank the nation's teams under the system, and awarded the Rissman Trophy to the winning university.

The Dickinson System was the first to gain widespread national public and media acceptance as a "major selector", according to the NCAA Football Records Book prior to the establishment of the Associated Press poll in 1936.

Trophies

Rissman Trophy

The original Dickinson System prize was the Rissman Trophy, named after Chicago clothing manufacturer Jack F. Rissman.

The Rissman Trophy was permanently awarded to Notre Dame following their third Dickinson title in 1930.

Rockne Trophy

Following the retirement of the Rissman Trophy and the death of Knute Rockne in early 1931, the second Dickinson trophy was named the Knute Rockne Intercollegiate Memorial Trophy.

Minnesota retired the Rockne Trophy after winning their third Dickinson title in 1940.

Methodology
An explanation for the mathematical calculations was usually given as part of the story of the season ending rankings.  In 1927, the AP story about the "national football championship" for that year noted that "Scores of 96 football teams were compiled by Dr. Dickinson in seven football conferences, including an Eastern group of 25 leading teams regarded for convenience as a conference... 
 
"The Dickinson system awards 30 points for a victory over a strong team, and 20 for victory over a weak team.  Defeats count half as much as victories [15 pts vs. strong team, 10 pts vs. weak team], and ties are considered as games half won and half lost [22.5 points vs. strong, 15 vs. weak].  Dividing this total by the number of games played gives the final rating." Professor Dickinson later added another variable, a "sectional rating" which provided for different points in games where the teams were from different sections of the country.

Annual rankings

References

College football championships
College football awards organizations